Get Cape. Wear Cape. Fly is the self-titled third album by Get Cape. Wear Cape. Fly. It was released on 13 September 2010.

Track listing
"Hand Me Downs"
"Collapsing Cities"
"Nightlife"
"All of This is Yours (feat. Baaba Maal)"
"Queen For a Day"
"All Falls Down"
"Where Will You Stand?"
"Stitch by Stitch (plus Interlude)"
"The Uprising"
"The Plot"
"Morning Light"

References

2010 albums
Get Cape. Wear Cape. Fly albums
Cooking Vinyl albums